D'Erlanger (a frankified form of a German name meaning "from Erlangen") may refer to:

 Frédéric Emile d'Erlanger (1832–1911), a German banker
 Emile Erlanger and Company, the bank he established
 Baron Emile Beaumont d'Erlanger (1866–1939), an Anglo-French banker and railroad tycoon
 Baron Frédéric Alfred d'Erlanger (1868–1943), an Anglo-French composer and banker
 Baron Rodolphe d'Erlanger (1872–1932), a French painter and musicologist
 D'erlanger (band), a Japanese rock band
 D'erlanger (album), their eponymous 5th album